Yusef Komunyakaa (born James William Brown; April 29, 1941) is an American poet who teaches at New York University and is a member of the Fellowship of Southern Writers. Komunyakaa is a recipient of the 1994 Kingsley Tufts Poetry Award, for Neon Vernacular and the 1994 Pulitzer Prize for Poetry. He also received the Ruth Lilly Poetry Prize. Komunyakaa received the 2007 Louisiana Writer Award for his enduring contribution to poetry.

His subject matter ranges from the black experience through rural Southern life before the Civil Rights era and his experience as a soldier during the Vietnam War.

Life and career
According to public records, Komunyakaa was born in 1947 and given the name James William Brown. (His former wife said in her memoir that he was born in 1941.) He was the eldest of five children of James William Brown, a carpenter, and his wife. He grew up in the small town of Bogalusa, Louisiana. As an adult, he reclaimed the name Komunyakaa, said to be his grandfather's African name. He  said that his grandfather had reached the United States as a stowaway in a ship from Trinidad. 

Brown served in the US Army, serving one tour of duty in South Vietnam during the Vietnam War. According to his former wife, Mandy Sayer, he was discharged on 14 December 1966. He worked as a specialist for the military paper, Southern Cross, covering actions and stories, interviewing fellow soldiers, and publishing articles on Vietnamese history, which earned him a Bronze Star. He has since used these experiences as the source of his war poetry collections Toys in a Field (1986) and Dien Cai Dau (1988), the title of which derives from a derogatory term in Vietnamese for American soldiers. Komunyakaa has said that following his return to the United States, he found the American people's rejection of Vietnam veterans to be every bit as painful as the racism he had experienced while growing up in the American South before the Civil Rights Movement.

After his service, he attended college at the University of Colorado, Colorado Springs, where he was an editor for the campus arts and literature publication, riverrun, to which he also contributed. He began to write poetry in 1973 and took the name Yusef Komunyakaa. He earned his M.A. in Writing from Colorado State University in 1978, and an M.F.A. in creative writing from the University of California, Irvine, in 1980. After receiving his M.F.A., Komunyakaa began teaching poetry in the New Orleans public school system and creative writing at the University of New Orleans.

Komunyakaa taught at Indiana University until the fall of 1997, when he became an English professor at Princeton University. Yusef Komunyakaa is a professor in the Creative Writing Program at New York University.

Poetry
 Komunyakaa's collection Copacetic fuses jazz rhythms and syncopation with hip colloquialism and the unique, arresting poetic imagery that has since become his trademark. It also outlines an abiding desire in his work to articulate cultural truths that remain unspoken in daily discourse, in the hope that they will bring a sort of redemption: "How can love heal / the mouth shut this way... / Say something that resuscitates / us, behind the masks."

Komunyakaa's I Apologize for the Eyes in My Head, published in 1986, won the San Francisco Poetry Prize. More attention came with the publication of Dien Cai Dau (Vietnamese for "crazy in the head"), published in 1988, which focused on his experiences in Vietnam and won the Dark Room Poetry Prize. Included was the poem "Facing It", in which the speaker of the poems visits the Vietnam Veterans Memorial in Washington, D.C.:

He's lost his right arm
inside the stone. In the black mirror
a woman's trying to erase names
No, she's brushing a boy's hair.
— from "Facing It"

Komunyakaa many other published collections of poetry, include Taboo: The Wishbone Trilogy, Part I (2004), Pleasure Dome: New and Collected Poems, 1975–1999 (2001), Talking Dirty to the Gods (2000), Thieves of Paradise (1998), Neon Vernacular (1994), and Magic City (1992).

In 2004, Komunyakaa began a collaboration with dramaturge and theater producer Chad Gracia on a dramatic adaptation of The Epic of Gilgamesh. The play was published in October 2006 by Wesleyan University Press. In spring 2008, New York's 92nd Street Y staged a one-night performance by director Robert Scanlon. In May 2013 it received a full production by the Constellation Theatre Company in Washington, D.C.

Komunyakaa's work has influenced many later American poets. He views his own work as an indirectness, an "insinuation":
Poetry is a kind of distilled insinuation. It’s a way of expanding and talking around an idea or a question. Sometimes, more actually gets said through such a technique than a full frontal assault.

Marriage and family
Komunyakaa married Australian novelist Mandy Sayer in 1985. That year, he was hired as an associate professor at Indiana University in Bloomington. He also held the Ruth Lilly Professorship for two years from 1989 to 1990. He and Sayer were married for ten years.

He later had a relationship with India-born poet Reetika Vazirani, and they had a son Jehan together. Vazirani killed the two-year-old boy and committed suicide in 2003.

Interviews 
Over the years, Komunyakaa has taken part in many interviews on his life and works. In a 2018 interview titled "The Complexity of Being Human," Komunyakaa addresses the careful use of language and influences of some of his most famous works such as "Facing It." He compares his work to that of a painter or carpenter. He states that poetry is vastly different from journalism in that his work is more violent, much like nature.

In his interview "The Singing Underneath," Komunyakaa describes the biblical influences in his work. He recalls reading the Bible in his youth and discovering what he believed to be underlying poetic elements. Komunyakaa also pays his respects to early influences such as Langston Hughes, Paul Laurence Dunbar, and Phillis Wheatley.

In a 2010 interview by Tufts Observer, Komunyakaa when asked to list the individuals who most influenced him, he names Robert Hayden, Bishop, Pablo Neruda, and Walt Whitman.

Below are a few of his most popular interviews:

 Interview: Paul Muldoon & Yusef Komunyakaa
 An Interview with Yusef Komunyakaa
 Still Negotiating with the Images: An Interview with Yusef Komunyakaa
 Yusef Komunyakaa: The Willow Springs Interview
 A Conversation Between Yusef Komunyakaa and Alan Fox, November 28, 1997

Bibliography

Poetry
Collections and selected poems

Below is a chronological table of Komunyakaa's poetry collections, as well as selected works published in each collection

Anthologies

Ghost Fishing: An Eco-Justice Poetry Anthology, University of Georgia Press, 2018.

Essays 
Condition Red: Essays, Interviews, and Commentaries, edited by Radiclani Clytus (University of Michigan Press, 2017).

Blue Notes: Essays, Interviews, and Commentaries, edited by Radiclani Clytus (Michigan, 2000).

Notes

References

External links

  The Chameleon Couch by Yusef Komunyakaa (2011)
 Profile and poems of Yusef Komunyakaa, including audio files, at the Poetry Foundation.
 Biography at ibiblio
 Views on Poetry
 Biography
 Profile and poems at Poets.org
 Video of Yusef's reading, 3/09/09, at the Boston Court Theatre in Pasadena, CA, as featured on Poetry.LA
 Yusef Komunyakaa Papers. James Weldon Johnson Collection in the Yale Collection of American Literature, Beinecke Rare Book and Manuscript Library.
 https://www.poetryfoundation.org/poets/yusef-komunyakaa

20th-century American poets
21st-century American poets
20th-century African-American writers
21st-century African-American writers
African-American poets
Poets from Louisiana
American male poets
Pulitzer Prize for Poetry winners
20th-century American essayists
21st-century American essayists
Writers of American Southern literature
American academics of English literature
Princeton University faculty
Indiana University faculty
University of New Orleans faculty
Colorado State University alumni
University of Colorado Colorado Springs alumni
American war correspondents of the Vietnam War
United States Army personnel of the Vietnam War
People from Bogalusa, Louisiana
1941 births
Living people
Members of the American Academy of Arts and Letters